Gary Perry is an American civil engineer and politician from the state of Montana.

Perry is from Manhattan, Montana, and owns his own business. He was elected to the Montana Senate in 2002 and reelected in 2006. He left the chamber after the 2010 elections due to term limits. He was running for Governor of Montana in the 2020 Montana gubernatorial election, but has since dropped out of the race.

References

External links

Living people
People from Gallatin County, Montana
Republican Party Montana state senators
Year of birth missing (living people)
Candidates in the 2020 United States elections